The 2012 Aegon GB Pro-Series Bath was a professional tennis tournament played on hard courts. It was the second edition of the tournament which was part of the 2012 ATP Challenger Tour and the 2012 ITF Women's Circuit. It took place in Bath, Great Britain between 19 and 25 March 2012.

ATP singles main-draw entrants

Seeds

 1 Rankings are as of 12 March 2012.

Other entrants
The following players received wildcards into the singles main draw:
  Liam Broady
  Oliver Golding
  Joshua Goodall
  Daniel Smethurst

The following players received entry from the qualifying draw:
  Illya Marchenko
  Marek Michalička
  Timo Nieminen
  Michael Ryderstedt

WTA singles main-draw entrants

Seeds

 1 Rankings are as of 12 March 2012.

Other entrants
The following players received wildcards into the singles main draw:
  Lucy Brown
  Samantha Murray
  Francesca Stephenson

The following player received entry into the singles main draw with a protected ranking:
  María Teresa Torró Flor

The following players received entry into the singles main draw as a junior exempt:
  Anett Kontaveit

The following players received entry from the qualifying draw:
  Martina Borecká
  Viktorija Golubic
  Elixane Lechemia
  Diāna Marcinkēviča
  Tereza Martincová
  Marina Melnikova
  Katarzyna Piter
  Patrycja Sanduska

The following players received entry from the qualifying draw as a lucky loser:
  Julia Kimmelmann

Champions

Men's singles

 Dustin Brown def.  Jan Mertl, 7–6(7–1), 6–4

Women's singles
 Kiki Bertens def.  Annika Beck, 6–4, 3–6, 6–3

Men's doubles

 Martin Fischer /  Philipp Oswald def.  Jamie Delgado /  Ken Skupski, 6–4, 6–4

Women's doubles
 Tatjana Malek /  Stephanie Vogt def.  Julie Coin /  Melanie South, 6–3, 3–6, [10–3]

External links
Official Website
ITF Search
ATP official site

Aegon GB Pro-Series Bath
Aegon GB Pro-Series Bath
Aegon GB Pro-Series Bath
Aegon GB Pro-Series Bath
2012 in English tennis